= Whiskey Street =

Bar and restaurant in Salt Lake City, Utah, U.S.

- Whiskey Street undergoing reconstruction in 2026
- Interactive map of Whiskey Street

Restaurant information
- Location: 323 South Main Street, Salt Lake City, Utah, 84111, United States
- Coordinates: 40.7621°N 111.8909°W
- Website: whiskeystreet.com

Whiskey Street is a bar and restaurant in Salt Lake City, Utah, United States. The establishment is owned and operated by Bourbon House Group.

== History ==
Whiskey Street participated in the city's 'open streets program' during the COVID-19 pandemic.

In August 2025, Whiskey Street was destroyed in a severe fire on its block. A year later, it was in the process of being reconstructed and reopened.

== Reception ==
In 2014, Kelli Nakagama named Whiskey Street the city's 'Best Bar for Whiskey' in The Utah Review's overview of the "Best Bars in Salt Lake City". The bar was included in Salt Lake Magazine's 2017 list of the "Top Salt Lake City Bars and Nightclubs".
